Melanthius, the son of Dolius, is a minor, yet important character in Homer's Odyssey: Odysseus's disloyal goatherd. In contrast, Odysseus's cowherd Philoetius and swineherd Eumaeus have both remained loyal to Odysseus during his twenty years of wanderings, as have Melanthius's father and six brothers.

Mythology 
Melanthius provides the best goats of the herd for a feast for the suitors of Penelope. He serves the suitors at the dining table, pouring them wine or lighting a fire in the hall upon their order. He is apparently favored by many of them: Eurymachus is said to like him best of all, and he is allowed to have meals in the same dining hall with the suitors.

Odysseus, disguised as a beggar and accompanied by Eumaeus, encounters Melanthius on his way into town, by the fountain dedicated to the nymphs. Melanthius immediately taunts Odysseus and proceeds to kick him on the hip, unaware that he is really dishonoring his master, causing Odysseus to consider attacking him. Later, when Odysseus is brought in front of the suitors, Melanthius asserts that he knows nothing of the stranger and that Eumaeus alone is responsible for bringing him in. His speech results in the suitors' rebuking Eumaeus.

Early in the battle with the suitors, Eumaeus and Philoetius catch Melanthius trying to steal more weapons and armour for the suitors. On the orders of Odysseus, they bind him and string him up from the rafters, where he is mocked by Eumaeus. When the battle is won, Telemachus (the son of Odysseus), Eumaeus, and Philoetius hang the twelve slaves, including Melanthius's sister Melantho, before turning their attention to Melanthius. They take him to the inner court, chop off his nose and ears with a sword, pull off his genitals to feed to the dogs, and then, in their fury, chop off his hands and feet.

Namesake 
 12973 Melanthios, a Jovian asteroid

Notes

References 
Homer, and Stanley Lombardo. Odyssey. Indianapolis: Hackett Pub. Co, 2000.
Homer, The Odyssey with an English Translation by A.T. Murray, Ph.D. in two volumes. Cambridge, MA., Harvard University Press; London, William Heinemann, Ltd. 1919. . Online version at the Perseus Digital Library. Greek text available from the same website.

Characters in the Odyssey